Clyde Hubert Wilson (December 28, 1889 – November 2, 1959) was an American football, basketball, and baseball coach. He served as the head football coach at Eastern Kentucky University from 1910 to 1911 and at West Tennessee State Normal School—now known as the University of Memphis—from 1912 to 1915, compiling a career college football coaching record of 11–19–2.

Wilson was born on December 28, 1889, in Bellbrook, Ohio. He earned a Bachelor of Science in Education degree from Miami University in Oxford, Ohio, in 1910 and a Master of Science in education from the University of Tennessee in 1917. Wilson was appointed the head of the industrial arts department at the University of Tennessee in 1925.
 He died on November 2, 1959, at a doctor's office in Knoxville, Tennessee.

Head coaching record

Football

References

External links
 

1889 births
1959 deaths
Eastern Kentucky Colonels athletic directors
Eastern Kentucky Colonels men's basketball coaches
Eastern Kentucky Colonels football coaches
Miami RedHawks football players
Memphis Tigers baseball coaches
Memphis Tigers football coaches
University of Tennessee alumni
University of Tennessee faculty
People from Bellbrook, Ohio
Coaches of American football from Ohio
Players of American football from Ohio
Baseball coaches from Ohio
Basketball coaches from Ohio